Parma Cathedral is a Roman Catholic cathedral in Parma, Emilia-Romagna (Italy), dedicated to the Assumption of the Blessed Virgin Mary. It is the episcopal seat of the Diocese of Parma. It is an important Italian Romanesque cathedral: the dome, in particular, is decorated by a highly influential illusionistic fresco by Renaissance painter Antonio da Correggio.

History
The construction was begun in 1059 by bishop Cadalo, later antipope with the name of Honorius II, and was consecrated by Paschal II in 1106. A basilica existed probably in the 6th century, but was later abandoned; another church had been consecrated in the rear part of the preceding one in the 9th century by the count-bishop Guibodo. The new church was heavily damaged by an earthquake in 1117 and had to be restored. Of the original building, remains can be seen in the presbytery, the transept, the choir and the apses, and in some sculpture fragments. The wide façade was completed in 1178: it has three loggia floors and three portals, whose doors were sculpted by Luchino Bianchino in 1494. Between the central and the right doors is the tomb of the mathematician Biagio Pelacani, who died in 1416.

The Gothic belfry was added later, in 1284-1294: a twin construction on the left side had been conceived, but it was never begun. Beside the Cathedral lies the octagonal Baptistery of Parma.

Interior

The interior has a Latin cross plan, with a nave and two aisles divided by pilasters. The presbytery and the transept are elevated, to allow space for the underlying crypt. The latter houses fragments of ancient mosaics which show the presence here of a cult temple from at least in the 3rd or 4th century AD. The side chapels were built to house the sepulchers of the noble families of Parma: two of them, the Valeri Chapel and the Commune Chapel, have maintained the original decoration from the 14th century.

Particularly noteworthy are the capitals, also in the exterior: many of them are characterized by rich decorations with leaves, mythological figures, scenes of war, as well as Biblical and Gospel scenes. The paintings, as revealed by a capital stripped of the 16th century gold painting, were originally polychrome.

In the right transept is the Deposition by Benedetto Antelami (1178). The cycle of frescoes in the nave and apse walls are by Lattanzio Gambara and Bernardino Gatti. Along the nave, in the lunettes above the spans are monochrome frescoes of Old Testament stories, as well as event of the passion. This culminates in the apse cupola, frescoed  with ‘’Christ, Mary, Saints, and Angels in Glory’’ (1538–1544) by Girolamo Mazzola Bedoli. The 15th-century frescoes in the Valeri Chapel are attributed to the studio of Bertolino de'Grossi. Those in the Capella del Comune, presumably by the same hands, were painted after the plague of 1410–11, and dedicated to Saint Sebastian. The Crypt has a monument to Saint Bernardo di Uberti, bishop of Parma 1106–1133, patron of the diocese. The monument, executed in the 1544 by Prospero Clementi and Girolamo Clementi on design of Mazzola Bèdoli.

The sacristy contains works attributed to Luchino Bianchini (1491). There are four reliefs by Benedetto Antelami, from 1178. The portal also has two carvings by Luchino Bianchino. Two great marble lions support the archivolt columns, and were carved in the 1281 by Giambono da Bissone. The Ravacaldi chapel has frescoes attributed to the studio of Bertolino de’Grassi.

The main feature of the interior is the fresco of Assumption of the Virgin decorating the dome, executed by  Correggio in 1526–1530.

See also
 History of medieval Arabic and Western European domes

References

Bibliography

Pauluzzi F. (1894). Il duomo di Parma e i suoi arcipreti. Udine, tip. del Patronato. 1894.

External links

Piazza Duomo Parma, Cattedrale; retrieved: 3 November 2018. 

Churches completed in 1106
11th-century Roman Catholic church buildings in Italy
Cathedral
Parma
Romanesque architecture in Parma
Gothic architecture in Emilia-Romagna
Cathedrals in Emilia-Romagna